The Marquette Golden Eagles men's lacrosse team represents Marquette University in Milwaukee, Wisconsin and competes in the Big East Conference of NCAA Division I. The Golden Eagles play their home games at Valley Fields starting in 2016 and were formerly coached by Joe Amplo.

History

Starting a program
Marquette started talking about adding a new program to its offerings in the summer of 2010. The athletic department eventually settled on lacrosse since the school lacked a spectator spring sport, and by September the move was approved by the Board of Trustees. The University partnered with former college head coach Dave Cottle, who led the search committee for the program's first coach. Marquette introduced former Hofstra assistant Joe Amplo as head coach on February 27, 2011.

2015: Put on the map
The first two years of play for the Golden Eagles went as expected. Marquette went 5–8 in its first season, earning the program's first victory on March 2, 2013 against Air Force, and 6–10 in the second season. It was 2015 when Amplo and his team started turning heads.

Marquette started its season defeating two straight ranked opponents, No. 18/16 Lehigh  and No. 17/19 Hofstra. On February 16 the Golden Eagles entered the media and coaches' top 20 for the first time in program history. They would move as high as 9th in the media poll.

However, Marquette couldn't hold on down the stretch. Losses to Georgetown, Bellarmine, Notre Dame, Duke  and Denver  ended the Golden Eagles tournament hopes.

Tournament Time
Despite the strong 2015 season, Marquette hadn't accomplished its goal of making the NCAA Tournament. The team wouldn't have to wait much longer.

After defeating Villanova in the first round of the BIG EAST tournament, the Golden Eagles shocked the lacrosse community on May 7, 2016, defeating then-No. 1 Denver 10-9 for the Golden Eagles' first BIG EAST title. The loss was the first for Denver in their three years of BIG EAST play and the Pioneers first home loss in 22 games. The win was only the second for a Marquette program over a top ranked team, and the first since the men's basketball team took down Kentucky in 2003. Liam Byrnes was named the tournament's most valuable player.

The win propelled the Golden Eagles from an on-the-bubble team to the sixth best seed and Marquette's first tournament appearance in just its fourth season of play. Marquette hosted its first NCAA Tournament game on May 14, 2016, a 10–9 loss to perennial powerhouse North Carolina. The Tar Heels would go on to defeat Maryland 14-13 in overtime for their first NCAA title since 1991.

All-time head coaches

Season results
The following is a list of Marquette's results by season as an NCAA Division I program:

{| class="wikitable"

|- align="center"

†NCAA canceled 2020 collegiate activities due to the COVID-19 virus.

Awards

Golden Eagles in the Pros
Six Golden Eagles have been drafted in the Major League Lacrosse Draft, six in the National Lacrosse League Draft and one in the Premier Lacrosse League Draft.

The following Golden Eagles players were selected in the Major League Lacrosse Draft:

The following Golden Eagles players were selected in the National Lacrosse League Draft:

The following Golden Eagles players were selected in the Premier Lacrosse League Draft:

References

Marquette Golden Eagles
Big East Conference men's lacrosse
Lacrosse clubs established in 2013